The 2011 Clipsal 500 was a motor race for the Australian sedan-based V8 Supercars. It was the second event of the 2011 International V8 Supercars Championship. It was held on the weekend of 17–20 March at the Adelaide Street Circuit, in Adelaide, South Australia. It was the thirteenth running of the Clipsal 500.

The event hosted races 3 and 4 of the 2011 season. The Saturday race was won from pole by 2010 Clipsal 500 winner, Garth Tander of the Holden Racing Team. The race was shortened by two laps after extended safety car periods for crashes involving Steve Owen, James Moffat and Russell Ingall. Owen crashed heavily into the infamous turn 8 wall on lap 45. Championship leader Jamie Whincup came home in second, with his Triple Eight Race Engineering teammate Craig Lowndes taking the last podium position.

Will Davison took his first pole position for Ford Performance Racing on Sunday. Steve Owen would not take part in the race due to the amount of damage sustained by his car in his Saturday crash. The race start was wet, with Whincup sliding backwards from second to fourth while Davison led Lee Holdsworth and Mark Winterbottom into turn 1. The first 20 laps involved much passing among the top eight cars. The track had dried out to a stage where slick tyres looked like a better option than wet tyres. The leaders began to pit around lap 25, just as the rain began to come down heavily. Holdsworth took on slick tyres in his pit stop and subsequently crashed into the turn 8 wall. Whincup went on to win the race from Rick Kelly and Winterbottom, extending his lead in the championship to 144 points.

Results
Results as follows:

Qualifying Race 3
Qualifying timesheet:

Top Ten Shootout
Shootout timesheet:

Race 3
Race timesheets:

Qualifying Race 4
Qualifying timesheet:

Race 4
Race timesheets:

Standings
 After 4 of 28 races.

References

Adelaide 500
Clipsal
2010s in Adelaide